Scymnus margipallens, is a species of beetle found in the family Coccinellidae described by Étienne Mulsant in 1850. It is found in North America.

References 

Coccinellidae
Beetles described in 1850
Taxa named by Étienne Mulsant